Lisa Marie Koroll (born 26 December 1997 in Eisenach, Germany) is a German actress and an author who popularly known for the role of "Tina Martin" in Bibi and Tina film series since 2014.

Career 
Lisa-Marie Koroll made her debut in 2005 as a child actress in the television series Familie Dr. Kleist, in which she was seen in the role of Clara Hofer from the second to the ninth and final seasons. In the summer of 2013 she was taken into the title role of Tina Martin in the cinema adaptations of the radio play series Bibi and Tina. She appeared in her first film in the role of Tina Martin in Bibi and Teena. It was directed by Detlev Buck and released on March 6, 2014.

She continuously played the role of Tina in all three films in the series. Koroll attended the Albert-Schweitzer-Gymnasium in Ruhla and passed her Abitur there in 2016. Koroll has not limited herself to acting, she is also an author. Her first book, (German: Lass Konfetti für dich regnen: Sei glücklich, nicht perfekt) was published in 2017.

In 2019 she was taken into a leading role in the RTL Zwei television series We are now and film Misfit and Abikalypse. In 2015 she was awarded the "Bunte New Faces Award" for the role in Bibi and Tina.

Filmography

TV shows

Films

Short videos

Awards

References

External links 

 Lisa-Marie Koroll at IMDb
 Lisa-Marie Koroll  at Instagram
 Lina - Egoist (Official Video) at YouTube
 So schafft ihr das Abi| ABIKALYPSE Interview mit LISA-MARIE KOROLL

1997 births
German actresses
German singer-songwriters
German writers
Living people